The Honeymoon Stakes is a Grade III American Thoroughbred horse race for three-year-old fillies over a distance of one and one-eighth miles on the turf course scheduled annually in late May or early June at Santa Anita Park. The event currently carries a purse of $100,000.

History
The event was inaugurated on 18 May 1952 as the Sea Breeze Stakes and was run at Hollywood Park Racetrack in Inglewood, California before a crowd of 41,369.  The event was run over 6 furlongs on the dirt and was won by Tonga in an upset starting at 51-1 defeating Princess Lygia and A Gleam.

The event honors the outstanding California bred mare, Honeymoon who won several races at Hollywood Park including the inaugural running of the Hollywood Oaks in 1946. Honeymoon was also successful at Santa Anita Park winning the 1948 Santa Maria Handicap.

The event was changed to the Honeymoon Stakes in 1956 then the Honeymoon Handicap in 1975.

The event was run in divisions in 1957 and 1965. The event was first run on the turf track in 1973.

The event was a Grade II from 1998 to 2018.

After the closure of the Hollywood Park Racetrack in 2013 the event has been held at Santa Anita Park.

The Honeymoon is a major leading prep race for the Grade I American Oaks run during the first part of July.

Distance
Since inception, the race has been contested at a variety of distances:
  miles : 1996–1999, 2002–present
  miles : 2001
  miles : 1971–1995
 1 mile : 1955–1967, 1970
 7 furlongs : 1954
 6 furlongs :  1952–1953

Records

Speed  record: 
  mile – 1:46.37  Going Global (IRE) (2021)
  mile – 1:40.20  Hot Option (1989)

Most wins by a jockey:
 5 – Eddie Delahoussaye (1987, 1989, 1990, 1993, 1995)

Most wins by a trainer:
 4 – Charles E. Whittingham (1967, 1971, 1972, 1982)

Winners

Legend:

 
 

Notes:

† Ran as an entry

‡ In 1993, the race was run off the turf, but retained its GIII status.

See also
List of American and Canadian Graded races

External links
 Santa Anita Media Guide for 2019 Winter Meet

References

1952 establishments in California
Horse races in California
Santa Anita Park
Flat horse races for three-year-old fillies
Turf races in the United States
Graded stakes races in the United States
Horse races established in 1952
Grade 3 stakes races in the United States